During the 1914–15 English football season, Brentford competed in the Southern League Second Division. The season began one month after Britain entered the First World War, which unsettled the squad as players left to undertake military or munitions duties. The Bees finished in mid-table in what would be the club's last season of competitive football until 1919–20.

Season summary

Brentford's players were due to report back for pre-season training during the week beginning 3 August 1914, but those preparations were disrupted by Britain's declaration of war on Germany on 4 August. Just two players had been signed, forwards Jack Curtis and Stephen Stonley. As the season got underway, Brentford lost just two of the first 10 Southern League Second Division matches, but by that point it had become obvious that the war would not be over by Christmas as predicted. Beginning in mid-October 1914, the squad was decimated by departures to serve in the army (Kent, Sloley, Hendren, Amos), work in munitions at the Royal Arsenal (McGovern, Johnson, Stonley) or on transfers (J. Curtis, Spratt). Reserves, guest players, free transfers and local amateurs were brought in to plug gaps in the squad, with full back Fred Price, half backs Mick O'Brien, Charles Allwright and forwards Michael Donaghy, Walter Chalk, F. Arnold and Charles Hibbert making up for the departures of the professionals in the second half of the season. Amateur Walter Chalk would become something of a minor success, scoring six goals in 9 appearances.

Notably, a 10–0 win over Abertillery on 28 November 1914 set a new club record, but the result was declared void two days later when Abertillery resigned from the Southern League. Earlier wins over Leyton and Mardy were also chalked off when those clubs also left the league. Brentford won just three of the final 15 matches of the season, with the one bright spot being the emergence of inside right Henry White. Low attendances meant the Bees finished a mid-table season £7,000 in debt (equivalent to £ in ) and 1914–15 would become the final season of competitive football until 1919–20, after the war ended in November 1918.

Three former Brentford players died during the season:
 Private Harry Gould, a former reserve team player, died whilst in training with the Royal Fusiliers on 7 September 1914.
Private William Mehew, an occasional player at the turn of the century, was serving in the Northamptonshire Regiment when he was killed during the Battle of Aubers on 9 May 1915.

 One-time England amateur international George Littler, a former Brentford reserve, was serving as a sergeant in the King's Royal Rifle Corps when he died of wounds suffered during the Battle of Aubers on 11 May 1915.

League table

Results
Brentford's goal tally listed first.

Legend

Southern League Second Division

FA Cup

 Source: 100 Years Of Brentford

Playing squad 
Players' ages are as of the opening day of the 1914–15 season.

 Sources: 100 Years of Brentford, Timeless Bees, Football League Players' Records 1888 to 1939, Bees Review

Coaching staff

Statistics

Appearances and goals

Players listed in italics left the club mid-season.
Source: 100 Years of Brentford

Goalscorers 

Players listed in italics left the club mid-season.
Source: 100 Years of Brentford

Management

Summary

Transfers & loans 
Guest players' arrival and departure dates correspond to their first and last appearances of the season.

References 

Brentford F.C. seasons
Brentford